is a junction passenger railway station in the city of Chōshi, Chiba, Japan, operated by East Japan Railway Company (JR East).

Lines
Matsugishi Station is served by the Sōbu Main Line and Narita Line, and is located 117.3 km from the western terminus of the Sōbu Main Line at Tokyo Station and 75.4 kilometers from the terminus of the Narita Line at Sakura Station.

Station layout
The station consists of a side platform and an island platform connected by a footbridge. The station building is a wooden, one-story structure. The station is staffed.

Platforms

History
Matsugishi Station opened on 1 June 1897 as a station on the Sōbu Railway. On 1 September 1907, the Sōbu Railway was nationalised, becoming part of the Japanese Government Railway (JGR). After World War II, the JGR became the Japanese National Railways (JNR). The station was absorbed into the JR East network upon the privatization of the Japanese National Railways (JNR) on 1 April 1987.

Passenger statistics
In fiscal 2019, the station was used by an average of 468 passengers daily.

The passenger figures for previous years are as shown below.

See also
 List of railway stations in Japan

References

External links

 JR East station information 

Railway stations in Chiba Prefecture
Railway stations in Japan opened in 1897
Chōshi